Woodland Park Hospital was a medical facility in Portland, Oregon, United States. Opened in 1962, the for profit hospital was known for its cosmetic surgery. Towards the end of its run the facility received national scrutiny over the handling of patients when the hospital was forced to call 911 for a medical emergency, and the hospital then closed in 2006.

History
Woodland Park opened in 1962 and was owned by doctors at that time. During the 1970s the medical facility added a large psychiatric ward. In 2002 the hospital was purchased by Symphony Healthcare along with Eastmoreland Hospital. Both hospitals then closed two years later. Then in 2005 Woodland Park re-opened under local ownership as Physicians' Hospital after receiving some financing from the Portland Development Commission.

Closing
In July 2005 the hospital itself was forced to call 9-1-1 when no doctors were on staff and a medical emergency occurred. The patient was then transferred to another hospital where she died. This incident would help lead to the hospital losing Medicare certification. Within a year other problems with patient care would lead to the facility closing on May 26, 2006. At closing, the hospital was licensed by the state to operate 200 hospital beds, but was only operating around 40. In August 2006 the property was bought by Medical Properties Trust Inc. for $17.8 million with plans for Vibra Healthcare to operate a long-term acute care medical facility at the site after renovations.

References

External links 
Willamette Week
One hospital closes, others travel expansion route - Portland Business Journal

Hospital buildings completed in 1962
Defunct hospitals in Oregon
History of Portland, Oregon
Hospitals in Portland, Oregon
Hospitals established in 1962
1962 establishments in Oregon
2004 disestablishments in Oregon
2006 disestablishments in Oregon